State Route 194 (SR 194) was a  route that ran through Clayton.

Route description
The western terminus of SR 194 was located at its intersection with SR 51 in Clayton. From this point, the route traveled east, and then northerly direction as it gone through downtown Clayton. As the route approached its terminus at SR 51, it intersects modern day SR 198 in a roundabout in Downtown Clayton. Then after it headed north then westbound to its terminus at SR 51 and SR 239.

History
SR 194 originated as a state highway designation for Elm Street from Wilson Avenue (then SR 193) to US 43 in Prichard, which was decommissioned in 1981 along with SR 193 (which was relocated elsewhere in 1985). The number was used again as renumbering of SR 51 Business through Clayton by 1987. It was renumbered by 1995 as an extension of SR 239.

Major intersections

References

194
Transportation in Barbour County, Alabama